Pure-play helium or primary helium is helium that is extracted from the earth as the main product. Normally helium is extracted from natural gas as part of the nitrogen rejection process. The motivation is the planned reduction in use of natural gas, and instabilities in the supply of helium.

Occurrence
To accumulate to an exploitable reservoir, helium must be trapped by a non-porous rock. It is usually accompanied by a larger amount of nitrogen.

Exploration
Some American helium explorers include American Helium, Energy Fuels Inc., Gran Tierra Energy Inc., Ring Energy Inc., and Yuma Energy Inc.

Australian companies include Blue Star Helium, Renergen Ltd, Grand Gulf Energy.

Resources
Exploration in Tanzania shows reserves of 138 billion cubic feet.

Grand Gulf Energy is drilling in the Leadville Dolomite Formation in Utah.

References

Helium
Resource extraction